Karmansbo is a mining village situated in Skinnskatteberg Municipality, Västmanland County, Sweden with 91 inhabitants in 2010.

References

External links 
Karmansbo official page

Populated places in Västmanland County
Populated places in Skinnskatteberg Municipality
Mining communities in Sweden